Canobie Corkscrew was a steel sit-down roller coaster located at Canobie Lake Park amusement park in Salem, New Hampshire. Canobie Corkscrew is one of many Arrow Development Corkscrew models produced between 1975–1979. The coaster was removed in 2021.

History

Designed by Arrow Development, Canobie Corkscrew was first operated in 1975 as Chicago Loop at the indoor amusement park Old Chicago in Bolingbrook, Illinois. It was the second roller coaster in the world to turn riders upside down twice. It stayed at Old Chicago until the park's closing in 1980. Chicago Loop was featured in the 1978 film The Fury.

In 1985, Canobie Lake Park purchased the ride. It lay unassembled for nearly two years, because if erected it would stand taller than the town of Salem would have allowed. In 1987, Salem gave Canobie Lake Park a waiver to put up the roller coaster. It was then renamed Canobie Corkscrew.

In August 2012, Canobie Corkscrew underwent a repainting. The coaster's support systems were painted white and the track itself was painted blue. Previously, the ride was yellow with black supports.

The ride was removed after the 2021 season.

Ride experience
The ride featured two inversions, two back to back corkscrews. At the top of the lift hill the coaster trains made a 180 degree right turn into the first drop. The train then rises through a quick right handed turn hill that is over the ride station. The train then descends and executes the two consecutive corkscrews before turning right into the final brake run. It was painted bright blue. The total duration of the ride was about a minute and a half, though without counting the lift hill, which was about 30 seconds. In total, the ride lasted about a minute and 30 seconds.

References

External links
 Canobie Corkscrew at the Roller Coaster Database
 Official Canobie Lake Park Website

Former roller coasters in New Hampshire
Buildings and structures in Rockingham County, New Hampshire
Roller coasters introduced in 1987
1987 establishments in New Hampshire
Salem, New Hampshire